Rhynchosciara is a genus of flies belonging to the family Sciaridae.

The species of this genus are found in Central America.

Species:

Rhynchosciara americana 
Rhynchosciara baschanti 
Rhynchosciara brevicornis 
Rhynchosciara busaccai 
Rhynchosciara cognata 
Rhynchosciara grelleti 
Rhynchosciara guimaraesi 
Rhynchosciara hollaenderi 
Rhynchosciara mathildae 
Rhynchosciara milleri 
Rhynchosciara papaveroi 
Rhynchosciara primogenita 
Rhynchosciara propingua 
Rhynchosciara vespertillio

References

Sciaridae